The .45 Super is a powerful smokeless powder center fire metallic firearm cartridge developed in 1988 by Dean Grennell, a well-known writer in the firearms field as well as managing editor of Gun World magazine. It is dimensionally similar to the .45 ACP round but has a thicker case wall and is loaded to higher pressures, which offers an average  improvement in muzzle velocity over the .45 ACP. The cartridge was co-developed by Tom Fergerson and Ace Hindman.

Development history
In 1988, a Gun World article detailed Grennell's efforts to update the .45 ACP for the 21st century, a difficult endeavor due to the inherent design limitations of the veteran round. Introduced in the early 20th century, the .45 ACP has a relatively large case capacity which was dictated by the relatively low pressure powders in use at the time of its development; as a result, it operates in the modest range of 19,900–22,000 copper units of pressure (CUP). In contrast, current day cartridges using modern nitrocellulose powders generating higher pressure can produce CUP in the 28,000–39,000 range. As it was originally designed for lower pressures, the .45 ACP case has relatively thin walls and weak case head and web specifications; it cannot reliably contain increased pressures. The layout of most M1911 pistols' chambers presents yet another challenge in that the case head is not fully supported in the cartridge feed ramp area; pushing the envelope in this critical area with too much pressure risks a catastrophic failure, resulting in a case bursting in the chamber. To rule out such a dangerous possibility, Grennell chose to use brass formed from the stronger and more modern .451 Detonics, shortened to the overall length of the .45 ACP design. Support for the case head was also addressed by adopting a new chamber and barrel design which supports the base area of the case. Other areas of the model 1911 pistol design were also strengthened, including the addition of a heavier recoil spring and a strengthened firing pin redesigned to prevent primer material from flowing into the firing pin channel under high chamber pressures.

Manufacturers such as Heckler & Koch GmbH currently offer pistols rated to fire .45 Super "out of the box". The Smith & Wesson Model 4506 and other models in the third generation 4500 series leave the factory with springs for the .45ACP, but feature full support for the .45 Super load when upgraded with a stronger spring.  Although they will chamber, the firing of .45 Super rounds in non-rated standard .45 ACP automatics is not recommended, as doing so risks a case failure in the unsupported chamber and at the very least batters the slide and almost certainly shortens the life of the pistol.

.450 SMC
The .450 SMC is a .45 ACP wildcat cartridge for use in robust .45 ACP firearms that uses a modified .308 Winchester case with a small rifle primer adapted for use in modern .45 ACP firearms. Only 1911 pistols or heavier firearms with upgraded heavier springs are recommended. A small rifle primer .308 Winchester case is first cut down then resized to .45 ACP specifications, then primed with a small rifle primer as opposed to using the lower pressure pistol primer. Using the higher pressure small rifle primer with .308 Winchester brass designed to withstand higher pressure rifle charges gives this .45 ACP wildcat a safe and substantial power increase to the standard .45 ACP. It supports higher pressure due to the use of a parent case originally designed for rifle charges.

Ballistics

Current status
Sedalia, Missouri–based Starline Brass company eventually began marketing factory-manufactured brass cases for the chambering, taking the round out of the obscure wildcat cartridge realm. In addition, Ace Custom .45's Inc. of Cleveland, Texas, trademarked the .45 Super name in 1994 and used to market factory .45 Super pistols, as well as gunsmith adaptations of .45 ACP pistols, and .45 ACP conversion kits. Ace Custom .45's Inc has since gone out of business and their website is down. Texas Ammunition, Underwood Ammo, and Buffalo Bore offer factory loaded ammunition, which is marketed by Ace Custom and others. The Dan Wesson .460 Rowland will also chamber a .45 Super.

Applicable firearms
 Heckler & Koch Mark 23
 Glock 21
 Smith & Wesson Model 4506
 Springfield Armory 1911 V-16 Longslide

See also
 List of handgun cartridges
 .44 Magnum
 .45 GAP
 .475 Wildey Magnum
 10 mm caliber
 11 mm caliber
 Table of handgun and rifle cartridges

References

45 Super
Wildcat cartridges